Vitali Anatolyevich Safronov (born 6 June 1973) is a Russian professional football coach and a former player.

Playing career
He made his professional debut in the Soviet Second League in 1990 for FC Zarya Kaluga. He played 6 games and scored 1 goal in the UEFA Cup Winners' Cup 1995–96 for FC Dynamo Moscow.

Education Graduated Malahovskiy State Institute of Physical Culture and Sports. First coach – Alexander Pavlov and Yury Ignatov.

Adult career began in Kaluga  Dawn. In the 90 years playing in Russian Football Championships for Moscow  Asmaral  and  Dynamo (FC Moscow), Soviet Wings  (football club, Samara), as well as farm clubs  Asmaral and  Dynamo  in the lower leagues. As part of the Moscow  Dynamo  won the 1994–95 Russian Cup, had 6 games and scored 1 goal in the 1995–96 UEFA Cup Winners' Cup.

In the summer of 1999 and moved from the Wings to the club First Division  Baltika  Kaliningrad, where he was offered a lucrative contract. But three months later, when the  Baltika  virtually collapsed, as most of the team left the club, do not even get all the money owed.

Signed a contract with the Voronezh   Fakel, which played two seasons in the Premier League. After leaving the  Fakel was playing in the first division for the club  Volgar-Gazprom, in the Second Division for the clubs  Salyut-Energia,  Fakel, SKA from Rostov-on-Don. Two-time winner of the area the  Center of the second division (2004 in the  Fakel  and 2005 in the  Salyut-Energia ). In 2007, as part of  Nika  from Krasny Sulin won zone  South  LFL.

Was the head coach of FC Lokomotiv Kaluga. Now – Head of team  in second league  Kaluga .

Honours
 Russian Cup winner: 1995.

References

External links 
 
 Интервью газете «Спортивная Рязань»

1973 births
Living people
Soviet footballers
Russian footballers
FC Asmaral Moscow players
PFC Krylia Sovetov Samara players
FC Dynamo Moscow players
FC Baltika Kaliningrad players
FC Fakel Voronezh players
FC Salyut Belgorod players
FC SKA Rostov-on-Don players
Russian Premier League players
FC Volgar Astrakhan players
Russian football managers
FC Nika Krasny Sulin players
Sportspeople from Kaluga
Association football forwards 
Association football midfielders